Sholayar Dam is a concrete dam built across the Chalakkudi River in Malakkappara in Thrissur district, Kerala of India.  The dam consists of main Sholayar Dam, Sholayar Flanking and Sholayar Saddle Dam.  It also contains Sholayar Hydro Electric Power Project of KSEB who owns the dam. Total installed capacity of the project is 54MW with 3 penstock pipes. The maximum storage capacity is 2663 feet. Sholayar is 65 km from Chalakudy town. The dam above Sholayar dam was Upper Solaiyar Dam owned by Tamil Nadu.

History 
Sourabh Singh Sholayar Dam, Sholayar Saddle Dam and Sholayar Flanking dam are commissioned in 1965.  The reservoir has an area of 8.705 square km and the length of the dam is 430.60 metres.  The Sholayar Dam has a height of 66 metres and 430 metres width, Sholayar Flanking Dam has a height of 18 metres from the foundation with 109 metres length and Sholayar Saddle has a height of 259 metres and 109 metres width.

Gallery

References

See also 

 List of reservoirs and dams in India
 Peringalkuthu Dam
 Athirappilly Falls

Dams in Kerala
Thrissur district
Dams completed in 1965
Dams in Thrissur district
Geography of Thrissur district
Reservoirs in Kerala
1965 establishments in Kerala
20th-century architecture in India